"The Ice Palace" is a modernist short story written by F. Scott Fitzgerald and published in The Saturday Evening Post on May 22, 1920. It is one of eight short stories originally published in Fitzgerald's first collection, Flappers and Philosophers (New York City: Charles Scribner's Sons, 1920), and is also included in the collection Babylon Revisited and Other Stories (New York City: Charles Scribner's Sons, 1960).

The ice palace referenced in the story is based on one that appeared at the 1887 St. Paul, Minnesota, Winter Carnival. A native of the city, Fitzgerald probably heard of the structure during his childhood. The ice labyrinth contained in the bottom floor of the palace appeared as part of the 1888 Ice Palace.

Plot 

Sally Carrol Happer, a young woman from the fictional city of Tarleton, Georgia, United States of America, is bored with her unchanging environment. Her local friends are dismayed to learn she is engaged to Harry Bellamy, a man from an unspecified town in the northern United States of America. She brushes off their concerns, alluding to her need for something more in her life, a need to see "things happen on a big scale."

Sally Carrol travels to the north during the winter to visit Harry's home town and meet his family. The winter weather underscores her growing disillusionment with the decision to move north, until her moment of epiphany in the town's local ice palace. In the end, Sally Carrol returns home.

Sequel 
Fitzgerald later wrote another short story, "The Jelly-Bean", which was published in the 1922 collection Tales of the Jazz Age. A sequel to "The Ice Palace", it returned to Tarleton with several references to many of the characters in the earlier work.

References

Works cited

External links 

 
 The Saturday Evening Post — "The Ice Palace" (HathiTrust)

Short stories by F. Scott Fitzgerald
1920 short stories
1920s short stories
American short stories
Works originally published in The Saturday Evening Post